Ger Ryan is an Irish film and television actress, whose credits include Queer as Folk, Family, The War of the Buttons, The Van, Moll Flanders, Intermission and Little Dog.

Career 
Ryan has twice been nominated for a Royal Television Society Award for Family and Amongst Women, and received several nominations in the Irish Film and Television Awards, including for Amongst Women, Intermission and The Return. She is also a recipient of a Belfast Telegraph EMA Award in for her work on A Place with the Pigs and Song of the Yellow Bittern. In 2007, she received an IFTA for her work on the two-part docu-drama, Stardust, by RTÉ. She also played Margie McEvoy in the BBC drama series, The Street. She later played the role of Maeve Harte in RTÉ's drama series, Raw, and that of Mary Carroll in the 2013 romantic comedy, The Callback Queen.

Filmography

Film

Television

References

External links

Year of birth missing (living people)
Living people
Irish film actresses
Irish television actresses